The Valencia Open Invitational was a golf tournament held in 1959 and was part of the PGA-sponsored Caribbean Tour, which began the previous year.

It was held at Carabobo Country Club near Valencia, Venezuela, from 5 to 8 February with prize money of US$10,000. Don January led from the start after a first round of 64. Further rounds of 71-71-67 gave him victory by 11 strokes from Ernie Vossler, taking the first prize of US$1,500.

Winners

References

Golf tournaments in Venezuela